The Oldsmobile  4-4-2 (also known as the 442) is a muscle car produced by Oldsmobile between the 1964 and 1987 model years.  Introduced as an option package for US-sold F-85 and Cutlass models, it became a model in its own right from 1968 to 1971, spawned the Hurst/Olds in 1968, then reverted to an option through the mid-1970s. The name was revived in the 1980s on the rear-wheel drive Cutlass Supreme and early 1990s as an option package for the new front-wheel drive Cutlass Calais.

The "4-4-2" name (pronounced "Four-four-two") derives from the original car's four-barrel carburetor, four-speed manual transmission, and dual exhausts  (Some maintain that the '2' indicated a limited-slip differential). It was originally written "4-4-2" (with badging showing hyphens between the numerals), and remained hyphenated throughout Oldsmobile's use of the designation. Beginning in 1965, the 4-4-2s standard transmission was a three-speed manual along with an optional two-speed automatic and four-speed manual, but were still badged as "4-4-2"s. 
Because of this change, from 1965 on, according to Oldsmobile brochures and advertisements, the 4-4-2 designation referred to the 400 cubic inch engine, four-barrel carburetor, and dual exhausts.  By 1968 badging was shortened to simply "442", but Oldsmobile brochures and internal documents continued to use the "4-4-2" model designation.

First generation

1964

The 4-4-2 was born out of competition between Pontiac and Oldsmobile divisions of GM. The high performance GTO version of the Pontiac LeMans intermediate had proved an unexpected success midway through the 1964 model year. Oldsmobile's hasty response was to beef up their own popular Cutlass, a task given to a team led by performance enthusiast and Olds engineer John Beltz (later responsible for the distinctive and powerful Toronado), aided by Dale Smith and division chief engineer Bob Dorshimer.

Contrasted with the 1964 Tempest LeMans GTO with its 389 cubic inch V-8 (introduced in September, 1963 as an option package), the Oldsmobile offering was a conservative package. Technically the "B09 Police Apprehender Pursuit" option, the 442 used the four-barrel carbureted 330 CID (5.4 L) V8, known as L79, but with shorter valve spring retainers, longer pushrods, M400 rod and main bearings, and high lift camshaft, raising rated (SAE gross) output to 310 hp (231.3 kW) at 5,200 rpm. Torque remained , although the torque peak rose from 2800 rpm to 3600 rpm. Enhanced handling was credited to the heavy duty (HD) suspension package that included HD springs (30% higher rating), HD shocks (valving with 50% more restriction), a 15/16 diameter front and 7/8 diameter rear sway bar, and boxed lower rear control arms with denser bushings.  Other standard 442 equipment included Muncie M20, heavy duty clutch with higher rate springs in the pressure plate assembly, HD manual steering ratio 20:1 versus the standard ratio 24:1, performance rear axle ratio 3.36:1, dual exhaust, 14x6 HD wheels sporting 7.5 x14 US Royal 80XP Black with red stripe tire, front fender and rear decklid 442 medallions, and a dual snorkel air cleaner. The 442 was not equipped with power brakes or steering, unless added as an option.  The frame, part number 3837595, was not unique or modified for the 442 option, and could be found under F85s equipped with a manual transmission. There was an HD frame option in 1964, part number 9773002; which was boxed, but it was not standard equipment for the 442.    Unlike the 1965 442 model built in Lansing, the 1964 442 does not have an option code on the data plate.  There is documentation available showing that the 1964 442 was built in both Lansing and Fremont.

The package was dubbed 4-4-2 based on its combination of four-barrel carburetor, four-speed manual transmission, and dual exhausts. It was available on any F-85 or Cutlass model except the station wagon, although most were Cutlass hardtop coupés (Oldsmobile archives indicate that approximately 10 four-door sedans were built with the B09 option).   A total of 2,999 were sold.

1965
With the GTO receiving GM corporate sanction to receive their full-sized car's 389 V-8, Oldsmobile followed suit and replaced the 4-4-2's standard 330 CID with the new 400 CID (6.6 L). The definition of "4-4-2" was then restated as referring to 400 cubic inches, a four-barrel carburetor (a 515 cfm Rochester four-jet), and two exhausts. The standard transmission became a three-speed manual with column shifter, with a floor shifter four-speed and Oldsmobile's two-speed Jetaway automatic transmission as optional. A heavy duty three-speed with Hurst floor shifter was introduced as a mid-year option. 

Other touches added to the 1965 were chrome body side scoops adorned with 4-4-2 badging, chambered dual exhaust pipes, chrome single snout air cleaner, and 4-4-2 badging on the dash.  Late in the year option N98 was added, which were chrome  wheels. It also offered standard bucket seats when optioned on the Cutlass and a 6,000 rpm tachometer, mounted in the optional console, more as decoration than for usefulness. Retractable front seat belts were optional. The turning diameter was 41 feet.

Car and Driver tested a 1965 4-4-2 and did 0–60 mph in 5.5 seconds.

Offered in four body styles, 4-4-2 sales rose to 25,003, including 3,468 convertibles.

1966
The 1966 4-4-2 shared a modest facelift with other Cutlasses. It came with a 400 ci L78 V8 rated at /440 lb•ft with a single four-barrel carburetor. Besides the convertible, the 4-4-2 option was available on both hardtop and pillared coupes, which shared the same roofline. Besides the new sweeping C pillar on coupes which featured a "flying buttress" recessed rear window, the new body had high, round rear fenders giving the car a more muscular appearance.

The W30 engine added an outside-air induction system (admitting cool air to the carburetors via tubing from the front grill) and a hotter cam, under-rated as producing the same  as the L69. The battery was relocated to the trunk to make room for the air hoses, which prevented the package from being ordered on convertible models. Only 54 W30s were built by the factory, although an additional 97 were produced for dealer installation.

The standard transmission was a three-speed manual with column shift and the two-speed Jetaway automatic with switch-pitch torque converter was optional. Hurst shifters became standard equipment with floor-mounted manual transmissions including the optional heavy-duty three-speed, M-20 wide-ratio four-speed or M-21 close-ratio four-speed. The standard 350-horsepower 400 engine could be ordered with any of the four transmissions, while only manual transmissions could be ordered with the L69 three two-barrel option.

Inside, a revised instrument panel featured two round pods for the speedometer and other instruments, replacing the horizontal sweep speedometer of 1964–65 models, but the rest of the basic dashboard designed was unchanged. F-85 models had base interiors with bench seats and rubber floor mats while the more lavish Cutlass versions came with full carpeting and featured Strato bucket seats of a new design with higher and thinner seat backs, or a no-cost bench seat option.

Production slumped to 21,997. The 4-4-2 still constituted only about 10 percent of Cutlass sales.

1967

For 1967 the 4-4-2's styling and base engine remained the same, save for minor trim changes, a distinctive louvered hood, and an increase in intake valve size to 2.067 from 1.99. The three-speed Turbo Hydra-Matic automatic transmission with Switch Pitch became available, replacing the two-speed Switch Pitch Jetaway, as was the case with the mid-sized muscle cars from other GM divisions (Pontiac GTO, Chevrolet Chevelle SS396, and Buick GS400). The heavy-duty floor-mounted three-speed manual transmission was now standard with the Muncie M-20 and M-21 four-speeds optional, all with Hurst shifters. Front disc brakes were a new option.

A GM policy decision banning multiple carburetors for all vehicles except Ed Cole's beloved Corvette and the Corvair saw the demise of the L69 with its triple carburetors, a rare option for Olds and an icon for Pontiacs since 1957.   The W30 remained available, although the four-barrel Quadrajet carburetor replaced the tri carb setup. New red plastic inner fender liners became part of the W30 package. 502 factory W30 engines were built to meet NHRA homologation rules, along with an unknown number of dealer-installed packages.

Unlike in previous years which the 4-4-2 option could be ordered on either baseline F-85 or upscale Cutlass models, the 1967 4-4-2 package was based on the top-line Cutlass Supreme series, including the sport coupe (with center post), Holiday hardtop coupe and convertible. Standard equipment on all models included Strato bucket seats or no-cost notchback bench seat, full carpeting, expanded Morocceen vinyl upholstery, heavy-duty suspension with rear sway bar, and wide-oval tires.

Like all cars sold in the U.S. for 1967, the 4-4-2 came standard with a group of occupant protection and accident avoidance features mandated by Federal law.  This package included an energy-absorbing steering column and safety steering wheel, padded dash, recessed controls, four-way hazard flashers, and a dual-circuit brake hydraulic master cylinder.

Production rose somewhat from the previous year, rising to 24,833.

Second generation
1968

The 4-4-2 became a separate model from 1968 through 1971. Despite the engine displacement staying at 400 CID, the engine was based on the new 455 V8's 4.25 stroke, with the bore decreased (to 3.87). Torque came at 3000–3200 rpm as opposed to the early 400's 3600 rpm peak, mostly due to a milder base cam grind.

All standard 1968 4-4-2 engines are painted a bronze–copper color, as with the 1967s, topped with a fire-red air cleaner. W-30 option cars were equipped with ram air intake hoses leading from chrome-topped dual snorkel black air cleaners to special under-bumper air scoops and set off by bright red plastic fender wells. In addition, a Turnpike Cruiser option was made available with a two-barrel carburetor; this was previously available on the Cutlass Supreme for 1967. 1968 was the first year for side marker lights and front outboard shoulder belts, and the last year for vent windows on hardtops and convertibles. 4-4-2s for 1968 had unique rear bumpers, with exhaust cutouts and special exhaust tips.

Hurst/Olds

In 1968 Oldsmobile partnered with Hurst Performance Research Corporation to create the Hurst/Olds rather than just adding Hurst shifters as with earlier models. The limited regular production run of 515 Hurst/Olds (459 Holiday Coupes/56 Sport Coupes) started out as regular 4-4-2s, but were treated to numerous distinct enhancements, both cosmetic and mechanical. All cars were painted Peruvian silver (a Toronado color) with liberal black striping and white pinstripes, exterior and interior H/O badging (unique to 1968), and a real walnut wood dash insert. Mechanically, the cars left the factory with two drive train combinations. Red 455 CID engines were backed by modified W-30 Turbo 400 automatic transmissions. A/C cars got W-46 engines with 3.08:1 rears while non-A/C cars got W-45 engines with 3.91:1 rears. All cars came with bucket seats and a Hurst dual-gate shifter in a mini-console. Also standard were numerous regular 4-4-2 options such as disc brakes, heavy duty cooling, and FE2 suspension. They shared the red fender wells and ram air setup with the W-30. Popular, but not standard, additional options included the tick-tock-tach and wood-grained steering wheel. Power front disc brakes were optional.

1969

1969 4-4-2s were very similar to the 1968 except the division tooth between the grilles, the trunk lid inlets for the tail lights, wing windows deleted on Holiday Coupes and convertibles, steering lock ignition switch on the steering column, standard headrests were added to the front seats, and the paint scheme. Twin hood stripes were now available to highlight the new dual-bulged hood. The 4-4-2 numerals grew to nearly double their previous size.  Optional disc brakes had updated single-piston calipers. The exhaust manifolds featured a new center divider for better performance. Other changes to the engine were minimal, but the Turnpike Cruiser option was deleted. A new optional W-32 high-performance engine was available with an automatic; it came with the W-30's forced air induction system, but had the base engine's milder cam. A total of 297 were built, including 25 sport coupes and convertibles each.

The Hurst/Olds returned, with a cameo white and fire frost gold striped paint scheme, large functional ram air mailbox hood scoops, rear pedestal spoiler, 15" SSII chrome plated rims, European racing mirrors, and a 380-horsepower 455 cid V8 that was detuned slightly from 1968. 906 production Hurst/Olds Holiday Coupes were built, plus 6 prototypes and 2 convertibles.

1970

1970 was the pinnacle of performance from Oldsmobile.4-4-2 A Source Book, Casteele, p. 63  In order to keep up in the horsepower arms-race, General Motors dropped the cap on engine size in 1970, and Oldsmobile responded by making the Olds 455 V8 the standard 4-4-2 engine. The 1970 model year can be identified by its vertical bars in silver grille, rectangular parking lights in front bumper, and vertical tail lights.

The revised body style and increased performance resulted in the 4-4-2 being awarded pace car duties at the Indianapolis 500 race in 1970. A high-performance W-30 package was offered, which added a fiberglass hood (option W25) with functional air scoops and low-restriction air cleaner, aluminum intake manifold, special camshaft, cylinder heads, distributor, and carburetor. Two W-30 equipped 4-4-2 Vista Cruisers were produced by special order. Rear shoulder seat belts were optional at $23.

However, the magazine noted that Oldsmobile engineers had earlier posted a best of 13.7 seconds on the same test car with a fresh tune.

New options for the 1970 4-4-2 included GM's variable-ratio power steering (option N47), a console-mounted Hurst Dual/Gate shifter for use with the Turbo Hydra-matic transmission, and aluminum differential housing and cover (option W27). All Oldsmobile V8s received new Positive Valve Rotators for the 1970s to increase engine valve life.

1971

Despite an industry-wide softening of muscle car sales, the 4-4-2 returned in 1971 with only minor modifications from the previous year. Engine output was down for 1971 due to a lower compression ratio (8.5:1), which affected all of GM's engines as the result of a corporate policy requiring engines to run on lower-octane regular leaded, low lead, or unleaded gasoline, in preparation for the introduction of the catalytic converter on 1975-model cars. The W-27 option was downgraded to an aluminum cover for the cast iron differential housing.

The 1971 4-4-2 was available in a hardtop coupe and convertible body type. The sport coupe disappeared for the first time since 1964, only to return in 1972. 1971 Model Year Appearance changes included a black grille with silver surround, silver headlight bezels, round parking lights in front bumper, and horizontal tail lights.

1972

By 1972, the muscle car era was unmistakably in decline due to the twin blows of rising insurance rates and increasingly stringent Federal emissions standards.  The 4-4-2 name reverted to an appearance and handling option package (option code W-29) in 1972 on the Cutlass Holiday coupe, Cutlass S sport coupe and Holiday coupe, and Cutlass Supreme convertible. The W-29 option was not available on Cutlass Supreme notchback hardtops. The 4-4-2 option package, which carried a modest sticker price of $29, consisted of the "FE2" suspension upgrades (heavy duty springs & shocks, front and rear sway bars, boxed lower rear control arms, and 14- by 7-in [356- by 178-mm] wheels), side striping, fender and decklid badging, faux hood louvers, and a unique grille. The rear bumper sported cutouts for exhaust tips, but only when paired with the optional L75 455 CID V8 in place of the standard Oldsmobile 350 V8.

Interior trims differed on each 4-4-2 bodystyle, much like the early 1964–66 models. For the base Cutlass hardtop coupe a basic two-spoke steering wheel, vinyl or cloth/vinyl bench seat, and rubber floor mats were standard along; Cutlass S sport coupe and Holiday hardtop coupe featured full carpeting, deluxe steering wheel, courtesy lighting, and bench seats with cloth-and-vinyl or all-vinyl upholstery or optional Strato bucket seats; and the Cutlass Supreme convertible came with more woodgrain interior accents than the "S", along with an all-vinyl notchback bench seat with armrest or no-cost Strato bucket seats; a center console was optional. An AM/FM stereo radio with a tape player was $363.

Other notable components of the W30 package included a lightweight aluminum intake manifold, the W25 fiberglass ram-air hood, anti-spin differential with 3.42:1 gears (3.73:1 available), and heavy duty cooling. Due to the low-vacuum at idle, air conditioning was not available, and power brakes were only available with an automatic transmission. Only 113 W30 convertibles and 659 W30 coupes were produced in 1972.

A special edition Hurst/Olds paced the Indianapolis 500 in 1972. The H/O coupe was based on the notchback Cutlass Supreme Holiday coupe (not offered with the 4-4-2 option) and the Cutlass Supreme convertible, both of which came standard with a 270-net horsepower 455 Rocket four-barrel V8 or optional 300-net horsepower W-30 option 455. Both H/O engines were mated to Turbo 400 transmissions with console-mounted Hurst Dual Gate shifters. A H/O Vista Cruiser was provided for the Medical Director.

Appearance changes included a silver grille with black surround, black headlight bezels, round parking lights in front bumper, and 3-section horizontal tail lights.

Third generation
1973

Originally expected to debut for the 1972 model year, the new "Colonnade" body style was delayed until 1973 due to an auto workers strike in 1972. The rear windows were fixed and the roof was reinforced in anticipation of roll-over standards being imposed by the government. These cars were a few hundred pounds heavier and slightly larger than the 1972's.

Consistent with 1972, the 4-4-2 option remained a handling and appearance package, code W-29, and was available on the Cutlass and Cutlass "S". It consisted of a faux louvered hood, FE2 suspension, specific grilles, emblems and stripes. Items such as dual exhaust and super stock wheels were optional, reflecting an industry-wide weaning of U.S. consumers from large powerful cars.

The W-30 (that had  in 1972) had become a trim package. The L77 "V" code 455 was there, but only with the 4-speed wide-ratio M-20 transmission. 1973 was also the last year of the 4-speed manual transmission in the Oldmobile "A" body. The L77 "V" code produced 270 net HP, the L75 "U" code 455 AT produced , while the "K" code 350 single exhaust produced  and the "M" code 350 with dual exhausts produced . Positraction rear ends, axle ratios, gauges, Super Stock wheels, HD cooling and many sport type options were optional. The L77 "V" code engine was also available in the Hurst/Olds without A/C, code W-46, the W-45 L75 "U" code was standard with A/C. Both 455s used the Turbo Hydra-matic 400 transmission, while the 350 was mated to the Turbo 350.

Interior trims for the '73 4-4-2 included a cloth/vinyl or all-vinyl bench seat and rubber mats on base Cutlass coupe, while Cutlass S included full carpeting on floor and lower door panels, woodgrain trim, deluxe steering wheel and more luxurious cloth-and-vinyl or all-vinyl bench seat, or optional swiveling Strato bucket seats with vinyl trim that could be rotated 90 degrees for easy exit/entry. Center console with floor shifter was optional with either the 4-speed manual or Turbo Hydra-matic transmissions.

1974

The 1974 4-4-2 received the same facelift as other Cutlasses that year including a revised grille and new flush taillights over a newly mandated  rear bumper to match the similarly mandated front bumper introduced in '73. It remained a handling and appearance package available on both base Cutlass and Cutlass S Colonnade coupes. Engine offerings included the standard  Rocket 350 four-barrel V8 or optional  Rocket 455, which reintroduced the W-30 code that signified the top 4-4-2 engine option package from 1966 to 1972. Power steering and Turbo Hydra-matic transmission became standard equipment on 4-4-2 and all other Cutlass models. The four-speed manual transmission with Hurst shifter was dropped from the option list.  GM-specification radial tires were introduced as an option.

Interiors were similar to 1973 with cloth-and-vinyl or all-vinyl bench seats standard, or optional swiveling Strato bucket seats with Moroceen vinyl upholstery. The center console with floor shifter was optional with bucket seats.

1975
The 1975 4-4-2 received revised vertical-bar grilles and continued with vertically stacked taillight lenses. It was once again a handling/appearance package on base Cutlass and Cutlass S coupes with content similar to previous years. Radial tires became standard equipment, along with a GM High Energy electronic ignition.

All engines were mated to catalytic converters, which required use of unleaded gasoline and spelled the end of true dual exhausts. With economy now a selling point following the 1973–74 energy crisis, the 1975 4-4-2 and most other Cutlass models no longer included a V8 engine as standard equipment. For the first time since its 1964 introduction, the 4-4-2 came standard with a six-cylinder engine, Chevrolet's 250 cubic-inch inline unit which had previously been offered on some Oldsmobile intermediates from 1966 to 1971 and the compact Omega since its 1973 introduction. Also new was a small Oldsmobile-built 260 cubic-inch Rocket V8 specifically designed for fuel economy. The 170-horsepower 350 Rocket V8 was now an extra-cost option along with the 190-horsepower 455 V8. A three-speed manual transmission was reinstated as standard equipment with the six-cylinder engine, with the Turbo Hydra-matic transmission optional with that engine and the only transmission offered with the V8 engines. Interiors again consisted of bench seats with cloth-and-Moroceen vinyl or all-Moroceen trim, or optional swiveling Strato buckets upholstered in Moroceen vinyl. Revised door panels featured pull straps. The console remained an option with bucket seats.

Due to Detroit's conversion from SAE Gross horsepower ratings (commonly referred to as "brake horsepower" (bhp) to SAE net for the 1972 model year, and ever-more stringent Federal emissions standards, engine output continued to significantly decline. The 1975 4-4-2 equipped with a 455 was rated by Oldsmobile at just 190 hp at 3400 rpm and 350 lb-ft at 2000 rpm.

1976

The 1976 4-4-2 shared a new aerodynamic sloped nose designed for NASCAR with split grilles and new quad rectangular headlights with Cutlass S models, along with revised lower sheetmetal with fewer creases than the 1973–75 models. The 4-4-2 option was offered on Cutlass S coupes and was once again an appearance/handling package. Engine/transmission offerings were unchanged from 1975 except that the 260 V8 could be ordered with a five-speed manual transmission. This was also the final year for the 455 Rocket V8.
Interiors again consisted of bench seats with cloth-and-Moroceen vinyl or all-Moroceen trim, or optional swiveling Strato buckets upholstered in Moroceen vinyl. A console was optional with bucket seats.

1977

The 1977 model year was the last for the 1973-vintage Colonnade body. The 4-4-2 was the only Oldsmobile intermediate to feature the NASCAR sloped nose from the '76 model, with the Cutlass S switching to an upright nose similar to Cutlass Supreme models. Engine offerings were revised, with Buick's 231 cubic-inch V6 replacing the base model Chevy 250 inline-six, with optional powerplants again including the Oldsmobile built 260 and 350 cubic-inch Rocket V8s. Transmission offerings included a three-speed manual or Turbo Hydra-matic with the V6, five-speed manual or Turbo Hydra-matic for the 260 V8, and Turbo Hydra-matic was the sole offering for the 350 and 403 V8s. Interiors included a standard bench seat with cloth-and-vinyl or all-vinyl bench seat, or optional Strato bucket seats with all-vinyl upholstery and without the swiveling feature of previous years. The console remained optional with bucket seats.

Fourth generation

1978
The 4-4-2 model continued on the downsized A-body platform introduced for the 1978 model year. The 1978 version of the 4-4-2 was an option package on the semi-fastback "Aeroback" Cutlass Salon, which was now the entry-level trim of the best-selling Cutlass range. It was offered with all powertrains available on the standard Cutlass, including the  two-barrel Buick V6,  two-barrel Oldsmobile V8, and  Chevrolet V8s, in either two- or four-barrel form. A three-speed manual transmission was standard, and a three-speed THM200 automatic was available with all engines; a Borg-Warner five-speed manual was offered with the 260 V8 and a four-speed Saginaw manual with the 305 V8.

Distinctive trim elements included contrasting striping along the rocker panels, lower doors, and wheelwells, badging on the rear trunk, and interior emblems. All other options offered on the Cutlass Salon were available with the 4-4-2 package.

1979
The 1979 4-4-2 remained based on the Cutlass Salon body style. The Hurst/Olds rejoined the lineup this year, based on the Cutlass Calais.

1980
The 4-4-2 moved to the notchback Cutlass Calais for 1980, with some of its performance heritage returning as it gained a larger  Oldsmobile V8 engine not available on other Cutlass models. It included W-30 badging on the front fenders above the side marker lights, with less dramatic graphics than before. Otherwise, the car shared identical powertrain with the 1979 Hurst/Olds, excepting the Hurst shifter. Also available only in gold over white or gold over black paint, a total of 886 were built: 540 in black, and 346 in white.

The MSRP of a Cutlass Calais in 1980 was $6,919.57. Option W-30 4-4-2 appearance and handling package consisted of: gold accent paint scheme (Y71), painted grille face, applique pillar molding, aluminum sport wheels, "W-30" decals on front fender, tail lamp bezel and rear window molding to match body color, "442" emblem on sail panel and deck lid, 5.7 liter engine (350 CID) V8, 4-bbl (L34), sport console (D55), Rallye suspension package (FE2), P205/70R14 steel belted radial ply blackwall tires with raised white letters (QFV) and a digital clock (UE8). The W-30 4-4-2 option was not available in California.

The 4-4-2 was not available from 1981 to 1984.

Fifth generation

The 4-4-2 name was revived in 1985 on the rear-wheel drive G-body Oldsmobile Cutlass Supreme due to the demise of Oldsmobile and Hurst's official collaboration on the Hurst/Olds but Oldsmobile wanted to continue to offer a performance-oriented Cutlass model to the public. The name was now defined as referring to the car's four-speed 200r4 automatic transmission, four-barrel carburetor, and two exhausts. This W42 model replaced the 1983 and 1984 Hurst/Olds models and used the same 5.0 L LG8 V8. The shifter was mounted on the floor in a console between the front seats, and the upgraded F41 suspension package was included. 3,000 were produced in the first year, and all were sold quickly. 4,273 were produced for 1986, and 4,208 were made in 1987.

All 1985 and 1986 4-4-2s used the already-sporty Cutlass Salon model as their base platform. Due to cost concerns, for 1987 it was decided they would use the less-expensive Cutlass Supreme model to base the 4-4-2 on. The package included a beefier drive train, 15 X 7 fully chromed styled-steel wheels with gold trim, manually inflated air shocks in the rear, special paint scheme (always silver at the bottom) and gold body stripe decal package, dual-snorkel air cleaner with chrome lid, mandatory A/C and door panel 4-4-2 emblems. With few exceptions (vinyl tops, painted pinstripes, chrome outside mirrors and wire wheel covers, for example), 4-4-2s could be ordered with much of the optional equipment found on other Cutlass models.

The 1984 Hurst/Olds and 1985–87 4-4-2 were equipped with an 8.5-inch GM corporate differential and all were equipped with 3.73:1 ring and pinion final drive gears. Rather than using the weaker 7.5-inch rear differential found in the Monte Carlo SS, these models used the same stout unit found in the Buick Grand National. Many 4-4-2s (and G-body Hurst/Olds) did not come with RPO G80 (limited-slip). This was, in large part, due to dealer ordering "packages" that grouped popular options together for ease of ordering. Problem was, G80 was not part of a single one of those popular option packages, but could be added a la carte. 

The 1983–84 Hurst/Olds and 1985–1987 4-4-2s are distinguishable by there being a "9" as the engine code found in the 8th character of their VINs.  These were the only models to get the hotter VIN 9 307 cubic inch engine, and it was the only engine available.  From 1983 to 1985, this engine was flat-tappet valve train, and rated at 180 hp/240 lb•ft torque. In 1986, the 307 engine received a roller-camshaft valve train and new swirl-port heads to improve economy and low-end torque.  HP dropped to 170, with torque climbing to 255LBS FT. The 1985 4-4-2 used an OZ code THM 200-4R transmission (as did the 1983–84 Hurst/Olds). Both 1986 and 1987 4-4-2 used the KZF code THM 200-4R. The KZF removed much of the shift harshness of the original OZ coded transmissions, but were still firmer than the run-of-the-mill overdrive transmissions used in the rest of Oldsmobile's lineup.

Sixth generation

The 4-4-2 option was revived on the Quad 4-4-2 front-wheel drive 1990–1991 Cutlass Calais. This model used a 2.3 L LG0 Quad-4 four-cylinder engine with four valves per cylinder and two camshafts.  The engine was tuned with higher output camshafts which produced more top end power at the expense of idle quality. It used a single exhaust with a dual tipped muffler and produced  with a five-speed manual transmission. 

This version of the 4-4-2 also played upon the "W-30" option code used in past versions of the 4-4-2, the exception being that this model used the option code "W-40".  A low production, late 1991 model year version used the option code "W-41"; the key differences of the "W-41" package were a  engine with a differently geared five-speed transmission.

This 4-4-2 model lasted just two years. 

Production totals:

1990 "W-40" = 2,629

1991 "W-40" = 1,160

1991 "W-41" = 204

GM literature referred to the 1992 and 1993 Oldsmobile Achieva SCX as a 4--42, the last time the designation was used. The Achieva SCX used the same W41 drive train as the very limited production 1991 4-4-2-W41.

Engines
 1964-1966 Oldsmobile 330 CID 4-barrel V8
 1965-67 Oldsmobile 400 CID 4-barrel V8 (4.000 in (101.6 mm) bore and 3.975 in (101.0 mm) stroke)
 1968-69 Oldsmobile 400 CID 4-barrel V8 (3.87 in (98 mm) bore and 4.25 in (108 mm) stroke) 290 hp
 1970 Oldsmobile 455 CID 4-barrel V8 (4.126 in (104.8 mm) bore and 4.25 in (108 mm) stroke) 370 hp
 1971 Oldsmobile 455 CID 4-barrel V8 (4.126 in (104.8 mm) bore and 4.25 in (108 mm) stroke) 340 hp; W30 350 hp
 1973–1976 455 CID V8
 1973–1977, 1980 350 CID V8
 1975–1976, 250 CID inline 6
 1975–1980 260 CID V8
 1977–1979 231 CID V6
 1978–1979 305 CID V8
 1985–1987 307 CID'' V8
 1990-1991 2.3 L LG0 quad-4

References

External links

 

442
Convertibles
Coupés
Muscle cars
1960s cars
1970s cars
Rear-wheel-drive vehicles
1980s cars